The 1936 Maine gubernatorial election took place on September 14, 1936. Incumbent Democratic Governor Louis J. Brann did not seek re-election. Republican Lewis O. Barrows defeated Democratic Party candidate F. Harold Dubord and Republican state legislator and Baptist minister Benjamin Bubar Sr., whose son Ben Bubar was later elected to the state legislature at 21 and later twice served as the Prohibition Party's presidential candidate.

Results

References

Gubernatorial
1936
Maine
September 1936 events